The National Oceanic and Atmospheric Administration Commissioned Officer Corps (or "NOAA Corps"), one of the eight uniformed services of the United States, has the authority to issue various awards and commendations to its members. These include individual honor awards, unit honor awards, service awards, training ribbons and qualification insignia. NOAA Corps awards and decorations include:

NOAA Corps Insignia

Command insignia 
There are three NOAA Command insignia: NOAA Command-at-Sea, NOAA Small-Craft-Command, and NOAA Chief-of-Party.

 NOAA Command-at-Sea Insignia is a gold-colored pin consisting of a triangle superimposed on anchor flukes and an unfurled commissioning pennant showing six triangles.  The NOAA Command-at-Sea insignia is authorized for incumbents serving under orders designating them in command of Class 1 through Class 5 NOAA commissioned vessels.  A NOAA Corps officer who previously successfully held command (but is not currently in command) of a NOAA commissioned vessel for at least six months during which the vessel was engaged for at least four months in operations at sea, is authorized to wear the Command-at-Sea insignia. 

 NOAA Small-Craft-Command Insignia is a bronze-colored insignia, of the same design and sizes as the Command-at-Sea insignia.  NOAA Corps officers not qualifying for the Command-at-Sea insignia but serving under orders designating them as officer-in-charge or in command of NOAA vessels, greater than 50 feet in length up through Class 6, may wear the Small-Craft-Command insignia.  An officer must have been in charge of or held command for at least six months during which the vessel spent four months in field operations, may wear the Small-Craft-Command insignia.  This insignia is not worn when the Command-at-Sea insignia is authorized. 

 NOAA Chief-of-Party Insignia is a gold-colored pin consisting of a raised equilateral triangle.  NOAA Chief-of-Party Insignia is authorized for incumbents serving in assignments designating them as Chief-of-Party or equivalent.  A NOAA Corps officer who has previously served in an assignment as Chief-of-Party, or equivalent, for at least six months during which the unit was engaged for at least four months in field operations may wear the Chief-of-Party insignia. 

For each of the three Command insignia, eligibility to wear them is not attained by a NOAA Corps officer being temporarily or acting in command due to absence, illness or transfer of the designated commanding officer, for periods of less than six continuous months.

An incumbent officer wears insignia centered 1/4 inch above the right breast pocket or pocket flap.  When a name tag or ribbon bars are worn on the right breast, the insignia is centered 1/4 inch above them.  On the men's Service Dress Blue coat, the insignia is positioned on the right breast as though there were a pocket.  On Formal Dress and Dinner Dress Jacket (Blue or White), men wear the insignia centered on the right lapel, 3 inches below the notch; women wear the insignia centered on the right lapel, down one third the distance between the shoulder seam and the coat hem.

A post tour officer wears insignia on the left breast 1/4 inch below the top of the pocket/flap.  Only one post-tour command insignia may be worn; the choice of insignia is at the individual's discretion.  When wearing two qualification insignia, the command insignia is worn 1/4 inch below the secondary insignia, or on uniforms with pocket flaps, 1/4 inch below the flap.

Qualification insignia 
NOAA Corps officers who have qualified as aviators, divers, submariners, parachutists, &c., or are otherwise entitled to wear a qualification insignia at their discretion.  As follows are the qualification insignia awarded by the NOAA.

 NOAA Deck Officer Insignia is a gold-colored pin displaying breaking waves, with a central device consisting of a fouled anchor surcharged with a NOAA Corps device.  NOAA Corps officers certified as Senior Watch Officer may wear the NOAA Deck Officer insignia after authorization by the Director of the NOAA Corps.

 NOAA Aviator Insignia is a gold-colored pin, winged, with a central device consisting of a fouled anchor surcharged with a NOAA Corps device.  NOAA Corps officer pilots and navigators may wear the NOAA aviator insignia after authorization by the Director of the NOAA Corps. 

 NOAA Diver Insignia is a gold-colored pin consisting of a NOAA Corps device surrounded by two dolphins.  NOAA Corps officers qualified as NOAA divers may wear the NOAA diver insignia after authorization by the Director of the NOAA Corps.

NOAA Corps officers with multiple qualifications may wear two insignia, placing one in the primary position and one in the secondary position.  Only one insignia from any qualification category (i.e., diver, aviator, etc.) is authorized for wear at the same time.

When wearing the insignia with ribbon bars or medals, the primary insignia is centered above ribbon bars or medals with the lower edge of the device 1/4-inch above the top row of ribbon bars or medals.  The secondary insignia is centered below ribbon bars with the top of the device 1/4 inch below the top of the pocket or pocket flap, or centered below medals with the top of the device 1/4 inch below the lowest row of medals.

Without ribbon bars or medals, the primary insignia is centered above the left pocket with the lower edge of the device 1/4 inch above the top of the pocket.  In dress uniforms, men center the insignia on the left lapel, 3 inches below the notch; women center the insignia on the left lapel down one-third the distance between the shoulder seam and coat hem.  Secondary insignia is centered 1/4 inch below the top of the pocket or pocket flap. On Dinner Dress Jacket uniforms, position the secondary insignia 1/4 inch below the primary insignia.  Secondary insignia are not authorized for wear on working uniforms.

NOAA Corps decorations and awards 
Members of the NOAA Corps may be authorized to wear awards and decorations presented by the Commerce Department, Defense Department and other uniformed services, the following list is limited to those awards presented by the NOAA Corps.

Personal decorations 
  Department of Commerce Gold Medal Awarded for extraordinary achievement supporting critical objectives of the Department of Commerce with significant beneficial effect on the United States or world.
  Department of Commerce Silver Medal Awarded for achievement supporting critical objectives of the Department of Commerce with significant beneficial effect on the United States.
  Department of Commerce Bronze Medal Awarded for extraordinary achievement supporting specific objectives of the Department of Commerce with beneficial effect on the United States or world.
  NOAA Corps Meritorious Service Medal Awarded for voluntary acts of heroism such as to stand out distinctly above normal expectations, meritorious service worthy of special recognition, and/or outstanding career service worthy of special recognition, in view of an officer’s sustained performance over multiple assignments.
  NOAA Administrator's Award Awarded for significant contributions in engineering and application, program administration and management, scientific research and achievement, public service, or equal employment opportunity.
  NOAA Corps Commendation MedalThe highest honorary award of the NOAA Corps: awarded for significant heroic, meritorious, professional service, or achievement warranting greater recognition than the NOAA Corps Achievement Medal.
  NOAA Corps Achievement Medal Awarded to a NOAA Corps officer or a member of another uniformed service detailed, assigned, or attached to NOAA: for Sustained Superior Performance or for a Special Act.
  NOAA Corps Director's Ribbon  Awarded to a NOAA Corps officer or a member of another uniformed service detailed, assigned, or attached to NOAA: for noteworthy achievements meriting recognition of lesser extent than the NOAA Corps Achievement Medal.

Unit awards 
  NOAA Unit Citation Award  Awarded to a group of employees in NOAA, through their individual and collective efforts: for substantive contributions to the programs or objectives for which NOAA was established.

Non-government decorations
 NOAA Association of Commissioned Officers (ACO) Award Medal
  NOAA ACO Junior Officer of the Year = NOAA ACO Award Medal Awarded annually to a NOAA Corps officer, below the grade of lieutenant commander: for outstanding contributions to NOAA, outstanding performance, and/or the positive reflection cast by the recipient upon the NOAA Corps.

  NOAA ACO Science Award = NOAA ACO Award Medal with bronze "S" Device Awarded for an outstanding scientific contribution made by an officer. This award is distinguished from the Junior Officer of the Year Award by a bronze "S" device attached to the large medal, miniature medal, and ribbon bar.

  NOAA ACO Engineering Award = NOAA ACO Award Medal with bronze "E" Device Awarded for an outstanding engineering contribution made by an NOAA Corps officer. This award is distinguished from the Junior Officer of the Year Award by a bronze "E" Device attached to the large medal, miniature medal, and ribbon bar.

 Society of American Military Engineers (SAME) Awards
  Society of American Military Engineers Colbert Medal with silver Triangle Device Awarded to a member of the National Ocean Service, officer or civilian, active or retired: for the most outstanding contribution to military engineering through achievement in design, construction, administration, research, or development.  Award is made by SAME.

  Society of American Military Engineers Karo Award with bronze Triangle Device A group award presented annually by SAME to a field unit of the National Ocean Service: for an outstanding contribution in an engineering or scientific field.

Campaign and service awards 
  NOAA Corps National Response Deployment Medal  Awarded to a member of the NOAA Corps, or a member of another uniformed service detailed, assigned, or attached to NOAA who distinguish themselves by significant participation in national response operations.
  NOAA Corps Outstanding Volunteer Service Award Medal  Awarded to a member of the NOAA Corps, or a member of another uniformed service detailed, assigned, or attached to NOAA who, subsequent to 1 August 2007, performed outstanding volunteer community service of a sustained, direct and consequential nature.
  NOAA Sea Service Deployment Ribbon  Retroactive to 1 January 2002, it is awarded for twelve months accumulated sea duty, which may also include temporary duty at sea, that includes at least one 90 consecutive-day deployment.
  NOAA Corps Atlantic Service Ribbon  A service award recognizing a sea duty assignment aboard a NOAA vessel operating in the waters of the Atlantic Ocean, Gulf of Mexico, Great Lakes or adjacent waters.
  NOAA Corps Pacific Service Ribbon  A service award recognizing a sea duty assignment aboard a NOAA vessel operating in the waters of the Pacific Ocean, Indian Ocean, Bering Sea, or adjacent waters.
  NOAA Corps Mobile Duty Service Ribbon  A service award recognizing a mobile duty assignment in the United States, its possessions or territories.
  NOAA Corps International Service Ribbon  A service award recognizing an assignment involving international service aboard ship or on land.
  NOAA Corps National Response Service Ribbon  A service award recognizing significant support to NOAA during a period of national emergency.

Qualification Ribbons
  NOAA Rifle Ribbon (no longer awarded)
  NOAA Pistol Ribbon (no longer awarded)

Ribbon devices 
Only one of each medal or service ribbon may be worn by NOAA Corps personnel.  Subsequent awards are indicated by certain attachments to the medal's suspension ribbon or on the ribbon bar.

 5/16 Inch Stars - are worn on personal decorations to denote subsequent awards of the same award.  A gold star represents a single subsequent award.  A silver star is worn in lieu of five gold stars, representing a sixth award of a decoration.
 3/16 Inch Stars - are worn on unit, service, and awards of non-government societies.  A bronze 3/16 inch service star is worn on the ribbon bar to denote subsequent awards.  A silver 3/16 inch star is worn in lieu of five bronze stars and represents a sixth award.
 Triangles - 3/16 inch triangles are worn, point up, on three awards worn by NOAA Corps personnel.  A bronze 3/16 inch triangle is worn on the ribbon bar of the Society of American Military Engineers Karo Award and a silver 3/16 inch triangle is worn on two other awards; the first is the Society of American Military Engineers Colbert Medal ribbon bar, the second is the NOAA Corps International Service Ribbon to denote an overseas Permanent Change of Station tour outside of the United States, its possessions and territories.
 "S" - A bronze 3/16 inch "S" is worn on the NOAA ACO medal suspension ribbon and ribbon bar to denote the ACO Science Award.
 "E" - A bronze 3/16 inch "E" is worn on the NOAA ACO medal suspension ribbon and ribbon bar to denote the ACO Engineering Award.

NOAA incentive awards (without medal or ribbon) 
 NOAA Technology Transfer Award 
 NOAA Distinguished Career Award

United States Coast and Geodetic Survey decorations and awards

The original ancestor organization of the NOAA Corps, the United States Coast and Geodetic Survey Corps, existed from 1917 to 1965, then went through a transitional period as the Environmental Science Services Administration Corps (ESSA Corps) from 1965 to 1970 before becoming the NOAA Corps. Like NOAA Corps personnel today, Coast and Geodetic Survey Corps officers were eligible for the Department of Commerce awards described above, as well as awards such as the above-mentioned Colbert and Karo Medals and the awards and decorations of other uniformed services with which they served. The Coast and Geodetic Survey had no awards of its own until 1945, when the following awards – all now obsolete but part of the heritage of the NOAA Corps – were authorized in recognition of service during World War II, the national emergency preceding it, or its aftermath:

 Coast and Geodetic Survey Distinguished Service Ribbon  Awarded to any Coast and Geodetic Survey commissioned officer or to any ship's officer or member of the crew of any Coast and Geodetic Survey ship who distinguished himself by outstanding conduct or service in the line of duty between 8 September 1939 and 28 April 1952.
 Coast and Geodetic Survey Meritorious Service Ribbon  Awarded to any Coast and Geodetic Survey commissioned officer or to any ship's officer or member of the crew of any Coast and Geodetic Survey ship who rendered service of a meritorious character between 8 September 1939 and 28 April 1952 but not of such an outstanding character as would warrant an award of the Coast and Geodetic Survey Distinguished Service Ribbon.
 Coast and Geodetic Survey Good Conduct Ribbon  Awarded to enlisted members of the crews of Coast and Geodetic Survey vessels for exemplary behavior, efficiency, and fidelity during service between 8 September 1939 and 28 April 1952.
 Coast and Geodetic Survey Defense Service Ribbon  Awarded to any Coast and Geodetic Survey commissioned officer or to any ship's officer or member of the crew of any Coast and Geodetic Survey ship who served at any time during the period between 8 September 1939 and 6 December 1941.
 Coast and Geodetic Survey Atlantic War Zone Ribbon Awarded to any Coast and Geodetic Survey commissioned officer or to any ship's officer or member of the crew of any Coast and Geodetic Survey ship who served outside the continental limits of the United States in the Atlantic War Zone between 7 December 1941 and 8 November 1945.
 Coast and Geodetic Survey Pacific War Zone Ribbon Awarded to any Coast and Geodetic Survey commissioned officer or to any ship's officer or member of the crew of any Coast and Geodetic Survey ship who served outside the continental limits of the United States in the Pacific War Zone between 7 December 1941 and 2 March 1946.

See also 
Uniformed services of the United States
National Oceanic and Atmospheric Administration Commissioned Corps
United States Coast and Geodetic Survey
Military badges of the United States
Awards and decorations of the United States military
Obsolete badges of the United States military

References 

 
Corps, National Oceanic and Atmospheric Administration Commissioned, Awards